Jamie Driscoll is a British Labour and Co-operative Party politician who currently serves as the metro mayor of the North of Tyne Combined Authority. He was previously a councillor on Newcastle City Council for the Monument ward.

Early life 
Driscoll was born in Middlesbrough, County Borough of Teesside in North Riding, Yorkshire in 1970. His father was a tank driver in the British army before becoming a shift worker at Imperial Chemical Industries, while his mother trained to be a youth worker. He states that his politics is influenced by his mother. He has four siblings; an older brother who served in the Royal Navy a sister who was a healthcare assistant for the NHS and younger brother Jon Driscoll, football commentator, podcaster and author of The Fifty, Footballs Most Influential PLayers). Driscoll left school at sixteen. During this time, he was training as an engineer making breathing apparatus. Driscoll decided to go to university later on, studying engineering at Northumbria University.

Early career 
After university, Driscoll worked as a project engineer and later became the manager and company director for a software development firm.

Political career 
Driscoll was elected to Newcastle City Council in 2018 to represent Monument ward. He is co-chair of the Newcastle branch of the campaigning organisation Momentum. Driscoll is a member of Transport and General Workers' Union and Tyne & Wear Anti-Fascist Association.

Mayor of North of Tyne 
Driscoll stood for selection to be Labour's candidate in the 2019 North of Tyne mayoral election, defeating Newcastle council leader Nick Forbes in February 2019. He ran as the more radical candidate after being supported by left-wing figures, including shadow Chancellor John McDonnell, Noam Chomsky, Paul Mason, Clive Lewis and Laura Pidcock. He also had organisational support from Unite the Union, Momentum, RMT, Fire Brigades Union, TSSA and Aslef. 

Driscoll ran on a platform with five primary pledges:

 Community Wealth Building
 Green Industrial Revolution
 Setting up Community Hubs
 Build Affordable Homes
 Meaningful Adult Education

Driscoll won the 2019 North of Tyne mayoral election with 56.1% of the vote. Upon taking office, he became entitled to the style of Mayor. As well as being elected as the first North of Tyne mayor, Driscoll was also the first metro mayor backed by Momentum.

Driscoll called a climate emergency on the day he was elected. In August 2019, he complained that not much progress had been made on his policies in the first 100 days as the combined authority still needed to find its feet. Since then, he has invested in the economy to create 2000 jobs, funded a non-coercive Working Homes programme to empower social housing residents with new skills, launched a Climate Change teachers programme partnering with the United Nations and put money into rural broadband infrastructure. He has also funded organisations like Kielder Observatory to get more children into STEM subjects, and funded a youth outreach project in collaboration with Newcastle United F.C.

Driscoll has stated his desire for all seven North East local authorities to come together to reform the original North East Combined Authority, made up of Northumberland County Council, Newcastle City Council, North Tyneside Council, Gateshead Council, South Tyneside Council, Sunderland City Council and Durham County Council.

Personal life 
Driscoll is married and has two children. His wife is an NHS doctor.

Driscoll was labelled "hypocritical" for sending his children to private school, despite running on a left-wing platform. Although he said he would not respond in detail to the accusation in order to protect the privacy of his children, The Huffington Post pointed out that he had chosen to include photographs of him with his family on his campaign website and social media.

He also faced criticism for "driving his high-polluting Land Rover to work" at Cobalt in North Tyneside. Reporting on the story, the Evening Chronicle highlighted that he had previously said "that his main priority is to try and make the North East's transport network the greenest in the UK." Driscoll later reported that he had "ditched" the Land Rover; he was "jokingly" congratulated by Richard Wearmouth, the Conservative deputy leader of Northumberland County Council, adding "that the area’s councils cannot be a “talking shop” when it comes to climate change."

References 

Labour Party (UK) councillors
Councillors in Tyne and Wear
Living people
1970s births
Year of birth uncertain
Labour Party (UK) mayors